Jeremiah 14 is the fourteenth chapter of the Book of Jeremiah in the Hebrew Bible or the Old Testament of the Christian Bible. This book contains prophecies attributed to the prophet Jeremiah, and is one of the Books of the Prophets.

Text 
The original text was written in Hebrew language. This chapter is divided into 22 verses.

Textual witnesses
Some early manuscripts containing the text of this chapter in Hebrew are of the Masoretic Text tradition, which includes the Codex Cairensis (895), the Petersburg Codex of the Prophets (916), Aleppo Codex (10th century), Codex Leningradensis (1008). Some fragments containing parts of this chapter were found among the Dead Sea Scrolls, i.e., 4QJera (4Q70; 225-175 BCE) with extant verses 4‑7.

There is also a translation into Koine Greek known as the Septuagint, made in the last few centuries BCE. Extant ancient manuscripts of the Septuagint version include Codex Vaticanus (B; B; 4th century), Codex Sinaiticus (S; BHK: S; 4th century), Codex Alexandrinus (A; A; 5th century) and Codex Marchalianus (Q; Q; 6th century).

Parashot
The parashah sections listed here are based on the Aleppo Codex. Jeremiah 14 is a part of the Sixth prophecy (Jeremiah 14-17) in the section of Prophecies of Destruction (Jeremiah 1-25). {P}: open parashah; {S}: closed parashah.
 {S} 14:1-9 {S} 14:10 {P} 14:11-12 {S} 14:13 {S} 14:14 {S} 14:15-18 {S} 14:19-22 {P}

Verse 1
The word of the Lord which came to Jeremiah concerning the drought.
"Drought": is rendered as Droughts (plural) in the New King James Version or the "Great Drought" in the New American Bible Revised Edition.

Verse 14
 And the Lord said to me, “The prophets prophesy lies in My name. I have not sent them, commanded them, nor spoken to them; they prophesy to you a false vision, divination, a worthless thing, and the deceit of their heart.
The false prophets rely on their own reason and the practice of divination instead of "divine commission".
 "A worthless thing" (from Hebrew: אליל or אלול ; KJV: “a thing of nought”): collectively "kingdoms of idolatrous worthlessness" worshipped in the time of Isaiah ((of Egypt)).

Verse 15
 Therefore thus says the Lord concerning the prophets who prophesy in My name, whom I did not send, and who say, ‘Sword and famine shall not be in this land’—‘By sword and famine those prophets shall be consumed!

Verse 16
 And the people to whom they prophesy shall be cast out in the streets of Jerusalem because of the famine and the sword; they will have no one to bury them—them nor their wives, their sons nor their daughters—for I will pour their wickedness on them.’

See also
Israel
Jerusalem
Judah
Zion
Related Bible parts: Isaiah 2, Isaiah 10, Isaiah 19, Isaiah 31, 1 Corinthians 14

References

Bibliography

External links

Jewish
Jeremiah 14 Hebrew with Parallel English

Christian
Jeremiah 14 English Translation with Parallel Latin Vulgate

14